David Walker (September 28, 1796August 6, 1830) was an American abolitionist, writer,  and anti-slavery activist. Though his father was enslaved, his mother was free; therefore, he was free as well (partus sequitur ventrem). In 1829, while living in Boston, Massachusetts, with the assistance of the African Grand Lodge (later named Prince Hall Grand Lodge, Jurisdiction of Massachusetts), he published An Appeal to the Colored Citizens of the World, a call for black unity and a fight against slavery.

The Appeal brought attention to the abuses and inequities of slavery and the responsibility of individuals to act according to religious and political principles. At the time, some people were aghast and fearful of the reaction that the pamphlet would provoke. Southern citizens were particularly upset with Walker's viewpoints and as a result there were laws banning circulation of "seditious publications" and North Carolina's "legislature enacted the most repressive measures ever passed in North Carolina to control slaves and free blacks".

His son, Edward G. Walker, was an attorney and in 1866, was one of the first two black men elected to the Massachusetts State Legislature.

Early life and education
Although the year of his birth is debated by historians, Walker was born in Wilmington, North Carolina. His mother was free. His father, who had died before his birth, had been enslaved. Since American law embraced the principle of partus sequitur ventrem, literally "that which is brought forth follows the womb", Walker inherited his mother's status as a free person.

Walker found the oppression of fellow blacks unbearable. "If I remain in this bloody land," he later recalled thinking, "I will not live long... I cannot remain where I must hear slaves' chains continually and where I must encounter the insults of their hypocritical enslavers." Consequently, as a young adult, he moved to Charleston, South Carolina, a Mecca for upwardly mobile, free blacks. He became affiliated with a strong African Methodist Episcopal Church (AME Church) community of activists, members of the first black denomination in the United States. He later visited and likely lived in Philadelphia, a shipbuilding center and location of an active black community, where the AME Church was founded.

Marriage and children
Walker settled in Boston by 1825; slavery had been abolished in Massachusetts after the American Revolutionary War. He married February 23, 1826 Eliza Butler, the daughter of Jonas Butler. Her family was an established black family in Boston. Their children were Lydia Ann Walker (who died July 31, 1830, of lung fever at the age of one year and nine months in Boston), and Edward G. Walker (1831–1910).

Career
He started a used clothing store in the City Market. He next owned a clothing store on Brattle Street near the wharfs. There were three used clothing merchants, including Walker, who went to trial in 1828 for selling stolen property. The results are unknown.

He aided runaway slaves and helped the "poor and needy". Walker took part in civic and religious organizations in Boston. He was involved with Prince Hall Freemasonry, an organization formed in the 1780s that stood up against discriminatory treatment of blacks; became a founder of the Massachusetts General Colored Association, which opposed colonization of free American Blacks to Africa; and was a member of Rev. Samuel Snowden's Methodist church. Walker also spoke publicly against slavery and racism.

Thomas Dalton and Walker oversaw the publication of John T. Hilton's An Address, Delivered Before the African Grand Lodge of Boston, No. 459, June 24, 1828, by John T. Hilton: On the Annual Festival, of St. John the Baptist (Boston, 1828).

Although they were not free from racist hostility and discrimination, black families in Boston lived in relatively benign conditions in the 1820s. The level of black competency and activism in Boston was particularly high. As historian Peter Hinks documents: "The growth of black enclaves in various cities and towns was inseparable from the development of an educated and socially involved local black leadership." By the end of 1828, Walker had become Boston's leading spokesman against slavery.

Freedom's Journal

Walker served as a Boston subscription sales agent and a writer for New York City's short-lived but influential Freedom's Journal (1827–1829), the first newspaper owned and operated by African Americans.

Walker's Appeal

Publication history

In September 1829, Walker published his appeal to African Americans, entitled Walker's Appeal, in Four Articles; Together with a Preamble, to the Colored Citizens of the World, but in Particular, and Very Expressly, to Those of the United States of America, Written in Boston, State of Massachusetts, September 28, 1829. The first edition is quite rare; a second and then a third edition appeared in 1830. Walker's second edition, of 1830, expressed his views even more strongly than the first edition. Walker appealed to his readers to take an active role in fighting their oppression, regardless of the risk, and to press white Americans to realize that slavery was morally and religiously repugnant.

The Appeal was semi-forgotten by 1848; a great deal of other abolitionist writing, much inspired by Walker, had appeared in those 18 years. It received a new life with its reprinting in 1848 by the black minister Henry Highland Garnet, who in another 17 years would be the first African American ever to address the U.S. Congress. Garnet included the first biography of David Walker, and a similarly-themed speech of his own, his 'Address to the Slaves of the United States of America.' which was perceived as so radical that it was rejected for publication when delivered, in 1843. The most influential white abolitionist, John Brown, played a role in getting the volume of Garnet printed.

Core issues

Racism
Walker challenged the racism of the early 19th century. He specifically targeted groups such as the American Colonization Society, which sought to deport all free and freed blacks from the United States to a colony in Africa (this was how Liberia was established). He wrote against published assertions of black inferiority by the late President Thomas Jefferson, who died three years before Walker's pamphlet was published. As Walker explained: "I say, that unless we refute Mr. Jefferson's arguments respecting us, we will only establish them."

He rejected the white assumption in the United States that dark skin was a sign of inferiority and lesser humanity. He challenged critics to show him "a page of history, either sacred or profane, on which a verse can be found, which maintains that the Egyptians heaped the insupportable insult upon the children of Israel, by telling them that they were not of the human family", referring to the period when they were enslaved in Egypt.

Equal rights
By the 1820s and '30s, individuals and groups had emerged with degrees of commitment to equal rights for black men and women, but no national anti-slavery movement existed at the time Walker's Appeal was published. As historian Herbert Aptheker wrote:

To be an Abolitionist was not for the faint-hearted. The slaveholders represented for the first half of the nineteenth century the most closely knit and most important single economic unit in the nation, their millions of bondsmen and millions of acres of land comprising an investment of billions of dollars. This economic might had its counterpart in political power, given its possessors dominance within the nation and predominance within the South.

Aptheker was referring to the provision in the Constitution that counted three-fifths of the slave population toward the total of any state, for purposes of apportionment of Congressional seats and the electoral college. This gave the white voters in the South power in electoral office much greater than their numbers represented; neither slaves nor free blacks could vote. It resulted in Southern politicians having enormous power and to the election of Southerners as president.

Effects of slavery
The Appeal described the pernicious effects of both slavery and the subservience of and discrimination against free blacks. Those outside of slavery were said to need special regulation "because they could not be relied on to regulate themselves and because they might overstep the boundaries society had placed around them."

Call to action

Resist oppression
In his Appeal Walker implored the black community to take action against slavery and discrimination. "What gives unity to Walker's polemic," historian Paul Goodman has argued, "is the argument for racial equality and the active part to be taken by black people in achieving it." Literary scholar Chris Apap has echoed these sentiments. The Appeal, Apap has asserted, rejected the notion that the black community should do nothing more than pray for its liberation. Apap has drawn particular attention to a passage of the Appeal in which Walker encourages blacks to "[n]ever make an attempt to gain freedom or natural right, from under our cruel oppressors and murderers, until you see your ways clear; when that hour arrives and you move, be not afraid or dismayed." Apap has interpreted Walker's words as a play on the Biblical injunction to "be not afraid or dismayed." As he points out, "'be not afraid or dismayed' is a direct quote from 2 Chronicles 20.15, where the Israelites are told to 'be not afraid or dismayed' because God would fight the battle for them and save them from their enemies without their having to lift a finger." In the Bible, all the Israelites are expected to do is pray, but Walker asserts that the black community must "move." Apap insists that in prompting his readers to "move", Walker rejected the notion that the blacks should "sit idly by and wait for God to fight their battles — they must (and implicit in Walker's language is the assumption that they will) take action and move to claim what is rightfully and morally theirs."

Walker's Appeal argued that blacks had to assume responsibility for themselves if they wanted to overcome oppression.  According to historian Peter Hinks, Walker believed that the "key to the uplift of the race was a zealous commitment to the tenets of individual moral improvement: education, temperance, protestant religious practice, regular work habits, and self-regulation."

"America," Walker argued, "is more our country, than it is the whites — we have enriched it with our blood and tears."

Education and religion
Education and religion were especially important to Walker. Black knowledge, he argued, would not only undermine the assertion that blacks were inherently inferior; it would terrify whites. "The bare name of educating the colored people," he wrote, "scares our cruel oppressors almost to death." Those who were educated, Walker argued, had a special obligation to teach their brethren, and literate blacks were urged to read his pamphlet to those who could not. As he explained: "[i]t is expected that all colored men, women and children, of every nation, language and tongue under heaven, will try to procure a copy of this Appeal and read it, or get some one to read it to them, for it is designed more particularly for them."

Regarding religion, Walker excoriated the hypocrisy of "pretended preachers of the gospel of my Master, who not only held us as their natural inheritance, but treated us with as much rigor as any Infidel or Deist in the world — just as though they were intent only on taking our blood and groans to glorify the Lord Jesus Christ." It fell upon blacks, he argued, to reject the notion that the Bible sanctioned slavery and urge whites to repent before God could punish them for their wickedness. As historian Sean Wilentz has maintained, Walker, in his Appeal, "offered a version of Christianity that was purged of racist heresies, one which held that God was a God of justice to all His creatures."

White Americans

Comparisons to other nations

In the Appeal, Walker criticized white Americans by comparing their position on slavery to other groups. Walker praised the British in the work, arguing that they were "the best friends the coloured people have upon earth. Though they have oppressed us a little and have colonies now in the West Indies which oppress us sorely—Yet notwithstanding they have done one hundred times more for the melioration of our condition, than all the other nations of the earth put together". In contrast, Walker denounced white Americans "with their posturing religiosity and their hollow cant of freedom" to "the lowest reaches of hypocritical infamy".

Opportunity for redemption
Despite Walker's criticism of the United States, his Appeal did not declare the nation irredeemable. He may have charged white Americans with the sin of turning "colored people of these United States" into "the most degraded, wretched, and abject set of beings that ever lived since the world began,", but as historian Sean Wilentz has argued, "even in his bitterest passages Walker did not repudiate... republican principles, or his native country." Walker suggested that white Americans only needed to consider their own purported values to see the error of their ways.

Inappropriate benevolent attitudes
Walker asserted that whites did not deserve adulation for their willingness to free some slaves. As historian Peter Hinks has explained, Walker argued that "[w]hites gave nothing to blacks upon manumission except the right to exercise the liberty they had immorally prevented them from so doing in the past. They were not giving blacks a gift but rather returning what they had stolen from them and God. To pay respect to whites as the source of freedom was thus to blaspheme God by denying that he was the source of all virtues and the only one with whom one was justified in having a relationship of obligation and debt."

Black nationalism
Walker has often been regarded as an abolitionist with Black nationalist views, in large measure because he envisioned a future for black Americans that included self-rule. As he wrote in the Appeal: "Our sufferings will come to an end, in spite of all the Americans this side of eternity. Then we will want all the learning and talents, and perhaps more, to govern ourselves."

Scholars such as historian Sterling Stuckey have remarked upon the connection between Walker's Appeal and black nationalism. In his 1972 study of The Ideological Origins of Black Nationalism, Stuckey suggested that Walker's Appeal "would become an ideological foundation... for Black Nationalist theory." Though some historians have said that Stuckey overstated the extent to which Walker contributed to the creation of a black nation, Thabiti Asukile, in a 1999 article on "The All-Embracing Black Nationalist Theories of David Walker's Appeal", defended Stuckey's interpretation.  Asukile writes:

Though scholars may continue to debate this, it would seem hard to disprove that the later advocates of black nationalism in America, who advocated a separate nation-state based on geographical boundaries during the nineteenth and twentieth centuries, would not have been able to trace certain ideological concepts to Walker's writings. Stuckey's interpretation of the Appeal as a theoretical black nationalist document is a polemical crux for some scholars who aver that David Walker desired to live in a multicultural America. Those who share this view must consider that Stuckey does not limit his discourse on the Appeal to a black nationalism narrowly defined, but rather to a range of sentiments and concerns. Stuckey's concept of a black nationalist theory rooted in African slave folklore in America is an original and pioneering one, and his intellectual insights are valuable to a progressive rewriting of African-American history and culture.

{{quotation|This country is as much ours as it is the whites, whether they will admit it now or not, they will see and believe it by and by.|David Walker, Appeal to the Colored Citizens of the World, Article IV}}

Distribution
Walker distributed his pamphlet through black communication networks along the Atlantic coast, which included free and enslaved black civil rights activists, laborers, black church and revivalist networks, contacts with free black benevolent societies, and maroon communities.

Reaction

Efforts to prevent distribution
Southern officials worked to prevent the Appeal from reaching its residents.Hinks, introduction and editor's note, xxxix. Blacks in Charleston and New Orleans were arrested for distributing the pamphlet, while authorities in Savannah, Georgia, instituted a ban on the disembarkation of black seamen (Negro Seamen Act). This was because Southern governmental entities, particularly in port cities, were concerned about the arrival and dissemination of information that they wanted to keep from black people, both free and enslaved. Various Southern governmental bodies labeled the Appeal seditious and imposed harsh penalties on those who circulated it. Despite such efforts, Walker's pamphlet had circulated widely by early 1830. Having failed to contain the Appeal, Southern officials criticized both the pamphlet and its author. Newspapers like the Richmond Enquirer railed against what it called Walker's "monstrous slander" of the region. Outrage over the Appeal even led Georgia to announce an award of $10,000 to anyone who could hand over Walker alive, and $1,000 if dead.

Immediate significance
Walker's Appeal did not gain the favor of most abolitionists or free blacks because its message was considered too radical.

That said, a handful of white antislavery advocates were radicalized by the pamphlet. The Boston Evening Transcript noted in 1830 that some blacks regarded the Appeal "as if it were a star in the east guiding them to freedom and emancipation." White Southerners' fears about a black-led challenge to slavery—fears the Appeal stoked—came to pass just a year later in the Nat Turner Rebellion, which inspired them to adopt harsher laws in an attempt to subdue and control slaves and free blacks.

William Lloyd Garrison, one of the most influential American abolitionists, began publishing The Liberator in January 1831, not long after the Appeal was published. Garrison, who believed slaveowners would be punished by God, rejected the violence Walker advocated but recognized that slaveowners were courting disaster by refusing to free their slaves. "Every sentence that they write — every word that they speak — every resistance that they make, against foreign oppression, is a call upon their slaves to destroy them," Garrison wrote.

Walker's Appeal and the slave rebellion led by Nat Turner in Virginia in 1831 struck fear into the hearts of slaveowners. Though there is no evidence to suggest that the Appeal specifically informed or inspired Turner, it could have, since the two events were just a few years apart; whites were panicked about the possibility of future insurrections. Southern states passed laws restricting free blacks and slaves.  Many white people in Virginia and neighboring North Carolina believed that Turner was inspired by Walker's Appeal or other abolitionist literature.

Lasting influence
Walker influenced Frederick Douglass, Nat Turner, William Lloyd Garrison, Martin Luther King Jr., and Malcolm X. Echoes of his Appeal can be heard, for example, in Douglass's 1852 speech, "The Meaning of the Fourth of July for the Negro":

Historian Herbert Aptheker has noted that

Walker's Appeal is the first sustained written assault upon slavery and racism to come from a black man in the United States. This was the main source of its overwhelming power in its own time; this is the source of the great relevance and enormous impact that remain in it, deep as we are in the twentieth century. Never before or since was there a more passionate denunciation of the hypocrisy of the nation as a whole — democratic and fraternal and equalitarian and all the other words. And Walker does this not as one who hates the country but rather as one who hates the institutions which disfigure it and make it a hissing in the world.

Death

Just five years after he arrived in Boston, Walker died in the summer of 1830. Though rumors suggested that he had been poisoned, most historians believe he died a natural death from tuberculosis, as listed in his death record. The disease was prevalent and Walker's only daughter, Lydia Ann, had died from it the week before Walker himself died.  Walker was buried in a South Boston cemetery for blacks. His probable grave site remains unmarked.

When Walker died, his wife was unable to keep up the annual payments to George Parkman for the purchase of their house. She subsequently lost their home, an eventuality Walker himself had, in a sense, predicted in his Appeal:
But I must, really, observe that in this very city, when a man of color dies, if he owned any real estate it most generally falls into the hands of some white persons. The wife and children of the deceased may weep and lament if they please, but the estate will be kept snug enough of its white possessor.

His son Edward G. Walker (also known as Edwin G. Walker) was born after Walker's death, and in 1866 would become the first black man elected to the Massachusetts State Legislature.

Legacy
As noted from the numerous sources, historians consider David Walker a major abolitionist and inspirational figure in American history.

The Library of Congress had an exhibit, Free Blacks in the Antebellum Period,'' which noted Walker's significance, along with that of other key black abolitionists: "Free people of color like Richard Allen, Frederick Douglass, Sojourner Truth, David Walker, and Prince Hall earned national reputations for themselves by writing, speaking, organizing, and agitating on behalf of their enslaved compatriots."
The National Park Service has walking tours developed for the Boston African American National Historic Site, including the Black Beacon Hill community. The comprehensive narratives include discussion of David Walker, who was integral to the black neighborhood and city activists. An online version of the tour is also available.

See also
List of African-American abolitionists

Notes

References

Sources

Crockett, Hasan (2001). The Incendiary Pamphlet: David Walker's Appeal in Georgia. The Journal of Negro History (86): 305–318.

Further reading

External links

Walker's Appeal, at Documenting the American South
David Walker’s Appeal in Virginia, at Virginia Memory
 
 
 
WGBH, Africans in America documentary
 
 Walker’s Appeal, in Four Articles; Together with a Preamble, to the Colored Citizens of the World, ... (Boston, 1830) (online pdf facsimile)

1796 births
1830 deaths
19th century in Boston
African-American writers
African-American abolitionists
Abolitionists from Boston
American fiction writers
19th-century deaths from tuberculosis
People from North End, Boston
American temperance activists
Tuberculosis deaths in Massachusetts